Arkansas Highway 193 (AR 193, Hwy. 193) is a north–south state highway in northeast Arkansas. The route of  runs from Highway 306 near Caldwell north across US Route 64 (US 64) through rural Cross County to Highway 42 near Hickory Ridge.

Route description
AR 193 begins near Caldwell at Highway 306 in northwest St. Francis County. After this overlap, the route continues north to a junction with US 64. Highway 193 has a junction with Highway 364 before it terminates at Highway 42 east of Hickory Ridge.

History
The route was designated a state highway under the jurisdiction of the Arkansas State Highway and Transportation Department (AHTD) between 1965 and 1966. The first segment was only between US 64 and Highway 284, with a northern extension coming in 1967. The route is entirely two–lane undivided most recently paved in 1980.

Major intersections
Mile markers reset at concurrencies.

|-
| align=center colspan=5 |  concurrency east,

References

193
Transportation in Cross County, Arkansas
Transportation in St. Francis County, Arkansas